James Joseph McArthur (9 May 1856 – 14 April 1925) was a Canadian surveyor and mountaineer  who was the first to climb several peaks in the Canadian Rocky Mountains. 
Two mountains and a lake are named after him, and he gave names to various other features.
He was a pioneer in the use of photography for surveying, under the direction of  the Surveyor General, Édouard-Gaston Deville. 
He did extensive work on surveying the borders between Canada and the United States in the Yukon and west of Lake Superior.

Early years (1856–86)

James Joseph McArthur was born on 9 May 1856 in Aylmer, Quebec.
He became a surveyor for the Dominion Land Survey.

Canadian Pacific Railway (1886–93)

The survey mapped the terrain along the CPR route between Canmore, Alberta, and Revelstoke, British Columbia.
He travelled with an assistant, T. Riley, who helped carry the heavy surveying and photographic equipment.

In 1886 McArthur ascended Paget Peak.
That year Otto Julius Koltz named the  Mount McArthur after him.
McArthur was the first European to describe Lake McArthur and Lake O'Hara.
He found the two lakes in 1887.
Towards the end of autumn in 1887 McArthur, his assistant and a packer camped for four days in the Bow Valley during a blizzard, then set out to climb the surrounding peaks. 
He wrote, 

In 1888 the Surveyor General, Édouard-Gaston Deville, decided to try photo-topographic surveying, working from triangulation stations on the peaks of mountains.
He hoped this would be faster, cheaper and more accurate than sketching.
McArthur went out with a camera that summer.
There were problems with exposure at first, but by 15 November 1888 McArthur had made use of 30 camera stations to make 23 triangulations that covered  the railway belt  to each side of the railway line from Vermilion Pass to Banff, Alberta, and covered the whole Rocky Mountains Park.
The negatives were sent to be developed by Horatio Nelson Topley's Photographic Division in Ottawa, and the prints returned to McArthur, where he calculated topographical details between the triangulation stations using the principles of perspective.

The next year McArthur continued the triangulation work and surveyed from the edge of the Rocky Mountains Park along the Bow River to eight miles east of the Kananaskis River.
McArthur made 15 triangulations, ascended 25 mountains and took 250 photographic views in 1889.
In 1890 he surveyed from Simpson Pass to Vermilion River.
In 1891 the surveyor William Stewart Drewry joined McArthur and the two began to survey using a double chain of triangles, a more efficient approach.
In 1892 they worked west to Field, British Columbia, having surveyed .
McArthur and Drewry were able to draw topographical maps from the photographs showing mountain elevations, although they could not add contour lines.

While surveying the CPR route McArthur was the first European to climb Mount Stephen (9 September 1887 with T. Riley), Mount Field and Mount Andromache (1887 with T. Riley), Mount Odaray (1887), Mount Rundle (1888), Mount Aylmer (1889), Mount Bourgeau (1890), Mount King (1892), Mount Owen (1892) and Mount Burgess (1892 with Henrietta Tuzo).
In 1891 alone McArthur climbed 43 peaks.
McArthur named Mount Aberdeen, End Mountain, Victoria Peak and Mount Victoria.

Later career (1893–1925)

McArthur undertook extensive surveying in the Yukon.
McArthur Peak in the Yukon is named after him.
In 1900 he named the  Mount Wood in the Yukon after Zachary Taylor Wood, a North-West Mounted Police inspector in Dawson City during the Klondike Gold Rush.

From 1908 to 1916 McArthur worked on the survey of the border between Canada and the United States between the Rocky Mountains and Lake Superior.
On 11 September 1908 McArthur and his party made the first ascent of Mount Larrabee.
In 1917 he was named Canadian Commissioner for the survey of the border between the Yukon and Alaska.
McArthur died on 14 April 1925 in Ottawa.
He is buried in the Cimetière Saint-Paul, Gatineau, Quebec.
Arthur Oliver Wheeler wrote of him,

James McArthur's home in the Aylmer sector of the city of Gatineau is designated a heritage building.
It is a -story rectangular wooden house on a large wooded lot built in 1850.
It has a straight gable roof and a large gabled dormer window.
The exterior shell is protected.

Publications

Notes

Citations

Sources

 

1856 births
1925 deaths
Canadian surveyors
Writers from Gatineau